Sanja Malagurski (born 8 June 1990) is a former Serbian volleyball player who competed in the 2008 Summer Olympics.

Career
In 2008, she was eliminated with the Serbian team in the quarter-finals of the Olympic tournament.

Sanja was playing for Brazilian club Osasco Voleibol Clube and won the silver medal in the 2014 FIVB Club World Championship after her club lost 0-3 to the Russian Dinamo Kazan in the championship match.

In season of 2017-2018 Sanja plays for Italian club Foppapedretti Bergamo.

Awards

Clubs
 2013/2014 Paulista Championship –  Champion, with Molico Osasco
 2014 Brazilian Cup –  Champion, with  Molico Osasco
 2014 FIVB Club World Championship –  Runner-up, with Molico Osasco
 2013/2014 Brazilian Superliga – 3rd place, with Molico Osasco

References

External links
 sports-reference.com

1990 births
Living people
Serbian women's volleyball players
Olympic volleyball players of Serbia
Volleyball players at the 2008 Summer Olympics
Sportspeople from Subotica
European champions for Serbia

Serbian expatriate sportspeople in Slovenia
Serbian expatriate sportspeople in Romania
Serbian expatriate sportspeople in Italy
Serbian expatriate sportspeople in Brazil
Serbian expatriate sportspeople in Poland
Serbian expatriate sportspeople in Turkey